The black-bellied cuckooshrike or black-bellied cicadabird (Edolisoma montanum) is a species of bird in the family Campephagidae.
It is found in New Guinea.
Its natural habitats are subtropical or tropical moist lowland forest and subtropical or tropical moist montane forest.

References

black-bellied cuckooshrike
Birds of New Guinea
black-bellied cuckooshrike
Taxonomy articles created by Polbot